The 1994 Kansas Jayhawks football team as a member of the Big Eight Conference during the 1994 NCAA Division I-A football season. Led by seventh-year head coach Glen Mason, the Jayhawks compiled an overall record of 6–5 with a mark of 3–4 in conference play, placing fifth in the Big 8. The team played home games at Memorial Stadium in Lawrence, Kansas.

Schedule

Roster

Team players in the NFL

References

Kansas
Kansas Jayhawks football seasons
Kansas Jayhawks football